Ursine may refer to:

Zoology
 Loosely, Ursidae, members of the bear family (conventionally designated ursids)
 Following the taxonomic convention, Ursinae, the subfamily

Places
 Ursine, Nevada